Carlton Cards Limited is a greeting card company in Canada. Its lines of cards include Carlton, Gibson and Tender Thoughts. It also distributes the American Greetings line of cards in Canada. Since 2009, "Carlton Card Retail" has been owned by Schurman Retail Group, its wholesale division remaining with American Greetings; the stores are set to close in 2020. The closure does not impact the 6000 Canadian retail locations that sell Carlton Cards products.

Carlton Cards was founded by Hubert Harry Harshman in Toronto, Ontario, in 1920. By 1933, it became incorporated. In 1956, Carlton Cards was purchased by American Greetings. Little is known about Harshman, but he did file a patent for card display with United States Patent Office in 1928.

References

External links

 Carlton Cards Limited
 Schurman Retail Group
 Hubert Harry Harshman on FamilySearch

American Greetings
Publishing companies established in 1920
Greeting cards
1920 establishments in Ontario
Companies that have filed for bankruptcy in Canada
Companies that filed for Chapter 11 bankruptcy in 2020